The GS-3 was a class of streamlined 4-8-4 "Northern" type steam locomotive operated by the Southern Pacific Railroad (SP) from 1938 to 1957.  A total of fourteen were built by the Lima Locomotive Works, numbered 4416 through 4429.  GS stands for "Golden State" or "General Service."

History
The popularity of the Southern Pacific Coast Daylight trains was overwhelming and prompted the Southern Pacific to initiate plans to introduce several new streamlined, lightweight trains: the Noon Daylight, the San Joaquin Daylight, and the Lark. A second order for 14 additional Daylight engines was placed with Lima Locomotive Works.  All engines were set up upon delivery at El Paso, Texas. Number 4416 was the first and was set up on November 3, 1937.  Number 4429 was last and set up on December 30, 1937. The GS-3 had an appearance similar to the GS-2. They featured a silver smokebox with a cone-shaped single headlight casing, skyline casing on the top of the boiler, skirting on the sides, an air horn to supplement the whistle, and teardrop classification lights. The only significant difference in appearance was the increase in driver size.

They received the orange and red "Daylight" paint scheme. They were primarily used on Southern Pacific's premier passenger train at the time, the Coast Daylight. In later years after being replaced by newer GS-4 class engines, they were painted black, had their side skirting removed for easier maintenance, and were reassigned to San Jose-San Francisco Peninsula Commute service, freight service, and made occasional appearances on the San Joaquin Daylight.

Preservation
After retirement in 1957, all GS-3s were scrapped.  However, one wheel from No. 4422, the first axle, right side, was rescued just before scrapping by William B. Fletcher.  It was donated to the RailGiants Train Museum at the Los Angeles County Fairgrounds in Pomona, California where it is on display.

Accidents 

On December 31, 1944, GS-3 4425 was hauling the Pacific Limited passenger train westbound near Bagley, Weber County, Utah when it was run into from behind by Mt-4 4361, pulling a mail express train. The first train had slowed because of a freight train ahead of it, but the second train's crew failed to see the signal in thick fog and collided with the first train at 50 mph. 50 people were killed and 81 injured in the disaster.

References

External links

 Southern Pacific Coast Daylight Engines

GS-3
4-8-4 locomotives
Lima locomotives
Streamlined steam locomotives
Passenger locomotives
Railway locomotives introduced in 1937
Steam locomotives of the United States
Scrapped locomotives
Standard gauge locomotives of the United States